Charles Edgar du Perron, more commonly known as E. du Perron, was an influential Dutch poet and author of Indo-European descent. He is best known for his literary acclaimed masterpiece Land van herkomst (Land of origin) of 1935. Together with Menno ter Braak and Maurice Roelants he founded the short-lived but influential literary magazine Forum in 1932.

Biography
E. ('Eddy') du Perron was born in Meester Cornelis, Batavia, Dutch East Indies on 2 November 1899, descended from French aristocracy. Most probably his bloodline can be traced back to Jean Roch du Perron (born in Bulhon, in Auvergne, France in 1756 – Died in Batavia, Dutch East Indies in 1808). His dad is Charles Emile du Perron (Born in 1861 in Batavia, Jakarta, Indonesia) and his mom is Maria Mina Madeline Bédier de Prairie (Born in 1864 in Penang, Malaysia).

Du Perron's family belonged to the landowning upper class of Indo aristocracy in the Dutch East Indies. His father was a wealthy entrepreneur allowing for a carefree childhood of the young du Perron. In 1921 the family moved to Europe and lived in a small castle in Gistoux, Belgium. In his early twenties du Perron sought distraction in Paris, Brussels, and cities in the Netherlands, mingling with the literary and artistic crowds. He befriended famous French writer and politician Andre Malraux and produced several writings.

After the suicide of his father (1926) and the death of his mother (1933), the family inheritance had gone up in smoke; the economic depression made it impossible to sell the castle. Du Perron, partly driven by economic necessity and partly by his revulsion of the rise of National Socialism, returned to the Dutch Indies in 1936. He continued to write and earned his living as a journalist and correspondent. He became the literary critic at the Bataviaasch Nieuwsblad ("Batavian Newspaper"), where he befriended Karel Zaalberg and Ernest Douwes Dekker. In his role as critic he also became the patron of the young Indo author Beb Vuyk. He sympathised with the Indies independence movement and became a close friend to Indonesian intellectual Sutan Sjahrir.

In August 1939, at the end of a stay of nearly three years in his home country, du Perron wrote to his friend Sutan Sjahrir (now a political exile):

'[..] In any case when in Holland I pretty much have always remained the awkward stranger. Through my French heritage, Indies upbringing and childhood, and through my Dutch language and customs... At the moment some – with whom I disagree – say I have been Europeanised. But put me in the real company of (Dutch East) Indies boys and ten minutes later they will recognize me as one of them. Where I feel at home…?, I know exactly now, that after fifteen years of wandering in Europe, I came back to my country… I belong here.[..]’

In 1940 du Perron visited the Netherlands. After learning that the Dutch army had capitulated after the invasion of Nazi Germany and the German bombing of Rotterdam, he died of a heart attack caused by angina pectoris on the evening of 14 May 1940 in the village of Bergen, coincidentally at about the same time his friend Menno ter Braak died of suicide in The Hague.

Writing
His early work was strongly influenced by modernism, but he soon decided that this was not his strength. The titles of his stories and poems better represented his talent for critical reflection towards reality and a certain detachment from everyday life. Like his friend, the author Menno ter Braak, he was a great admirer of the famous writer Multatuli. But much more than Ter Braak, du Perron was in fact his cultural heir.

Du Perron's masterpiece Land of Origin (1935) is strongly influenced by Multatuli and Malraux, but rather it is a work that stands alone in Dutch literature as a true autobiographical novel. Extracts from the Dutch East Indies of his childhood are interspersed with European episodes, mostly located in Paris, where du Perron paints a sharp portrait of Europe, based on interviews with his contemporary intellectuals and artists. The freshness of du Perron's observations and the liveliness of his imagination makes Land of Origin among the best Dutch novels of the twentieth century.

Apart from poetry and prose (a novel, stories and essays), Du Perron published several translations from French (Valery Larbaud, André Malraux) and one from English (Walter Savage Landor). Also, he was active as a private publisher.

"Erotic" poems
Early in his career, Du Perron wrote a number of poems that fall under the heading of "priapic literature", named for the Priapeia. "De koning en zijn min" is a narrative poem in fourteen stanzas, detailing the sexual adventures of a 17-year old king and his sexual encounter with his wet nurse. "Het lied van vrouwe Carola" (1927) is modeled after medieval ballads, and sees a woman of the nobility taking the place of her son's lover. "In memoriam Agathae" is a crown of sonnets that Du Perron self-published in 1924 under the pseudonym W. C. Kloot van Neukema, and its final sonnet closes with a sestet adapted from a sonnet by Willem Kloos. In 1937, Du Perron was working on a volume containing all his erotic poetry, Kloof tegen cylinder ("chasm against cylinder"), to be published under the pseudonym Cesar Bombay, a reference to one of Stendhal's pen names.

Legacy
The E. du Perron Society is a literary society in the Netherlands founded in 1994. It is an association devoted to a single author and has around 70 members and an additional number of subscribers, including several universities and libraries. On the 54th commemoration of his passing on 14 May 1994 in the village of Bergen the first public meeting for members was held, who also visited his grave at the public cemetery there.

The society aims to accumulate and deepen the knowledge regarding E. du Perron, both the person and his work, and contribute to the continued appreciation of his literary, artistic and social significance.

Every year Tilburg University also awards a cultural prize named after E. du Perron.

Bibliography
 1923 – Manuscrit trouvé dans une poche
 1926 – Bij gebrek aan ernst (added to in 1928 and 1932)
 1927 – Poging tot afstand (poem)
 1929 – Nutteloos verzet
 1930 – Parlando (poem)
 1931 – Voor kleine parochie
 1931 – Vriend of vijand
 1932 – Mikrochaos
 1933 – Tegenonderzoek
 1933 – Uren met Dirk Coster (essay)
 1934 – De smalle mens (essay)
 1935 – Het land van herkomst (novel)  
 1936 – Blocnote klein formaat (essay)
 1937 – De man van Lebak
 1938 – Multatuli, tweede pleidooi
 1939 – Schandaal in Holland
 1941 – De grijze dashond (poem) (with preface by Simon Vestdijk)
 1942 – Een grote stilte
 1943 – Scheepsjournaal van Arthur Ducroo
 1955–1959 – Verzameld werk
 1962–1967 – Menno ter Braak/E.d.P. Briefwisseling 1930–1940 (4 vols.)
 1977-1990 – Brieven (9 vols.)

References

Bibliography
 Batten, F.E.A., en A.A.M. Stols: Bibliographie van de werken van Charles Edgar du Perron, Meijer, Wormerveer, 1948
 Snoek, Kees: E. du Perron. Het leven van een smalle mens. (Uitg. Nijgh & Van Ditmar, Amsterdam, 2005.)

Notes

External links

 Eddy du Perron Genootschap
 Biography by ING, the Institute for Dutch History
 Royal Library – Collection E. du Perron

1899 births
1940 deaths
Dutch male poets
20th-century Dutch novelists
20th-century Dutch male writers
Dutch literary critics
People of the Dutch East Indies
People from Batavia, Dutch East Indies
Indo people
Dutch people of French descent
Indonesian people of French descent
Indonesian people of Dutch descent
Dutch male novelists
20th-century Dutch journalists